Elaine Pen (born 2 February 1990, Leiden) is a Dutch equestrian. At the 2012 Summer Olympics she competed in the Individual eventing and the team eventing as part of the Dutch team.

References

1990 births
Living people
Dutch female equestrians
Olympic equestrians of the Netherlands
Equestrians at the 2012 Summer Olympics
Sportspeople from Leiden
21st-century Dutch women